Arthur Harling Stott (November 21, 1909 – August 25, 1993) was a Canadian diver who competed in the 1932 Summer Olympics. He was born in Victoria, British Columbia.

In 1932, he finished eleventh in the 3 metre springboard event. At the 1930 Empire Games he won the bronze medals in the 3 metre springboard competition.

References

1909 births
1993 deaths
Canadian male divers
Commonwealth Games bronze medallists for Canada
Divers at the 1930 British Empire Games
Divers at the 1932 Summer Olympics
Olympic divers of Canada
Divers from Victoria, British Columbia
Commonwealth Games medallists in diving
Medallists at the 1930 British Empire Games